This is the List of municipalities in Ardahan Province, Turkey  .

References 

Geography of Ardahan Province
Ardahan